Arf-GAP with Rho-GAP domain, ANK repeat and PH domain-containing protein 2 is a protein that in humans is encoded by the ARAP2 gene.

Function 

The protein encoded by this gene contains ARF-GAP, RHO-GAP, ankyrin repeat, RAS-associating, and pleckstrin homology domains. This protein lacks the predicted catalytic arginine in the RHO-GAP domain and is therefore unlikely to have RHO-GAP activity. While the encoded protein does contain a sterile alpha motif (SAM) commonly found in some signaling molecules, the function of the protein has not been determined. Two transcript variants encoding different isoforms have been found for this gene.

References

External links

Further reading